The 1959 Northwestern Wildcats team represented Northwestern University during the 1959 Big Ten Conference football season. In their fourth year under head coach Ara Parseghian, the Wildcats compiled a 6–3 record (4–3 against Big Ten Conference opponents), finished in fifth place in the Big Ten, and outscored their opponents by a combined total of 174 to 134.  The team rose to #2 in the AP Poll before losing three consecutive games to end the season.

Schedule

References

Northwestern
Northwestern Wildcats football seasons
Northwestern Wildcats football